Thomas Henry Moone Sr. (November 6, 1908 – July 25, 1986) was an American ice hockey player who competed in the 1936 Winter Olympics.

In 1936 he was a member of the American ice hockey team, which won the bronze medal. He also played for the Boston Bruins old timers even though he was never a member of the Boston Bruins.

He was born in Ottawa, Ontario and died in Lexington, Massachusetts.

External links

Sports-Reference

1908 births
1986 deaths
American men's ice hockey players
Boston Olympics players
Ice hockey people from Ottawa
Ice hockey players at the 1936 Winter Olympics
Medalists at the 1936 Winter Olympics
Olympic bronze medalists for the United States in ice hockey